{{Infobox military person
|name=Günter Schwartzkopff
|birth_date=5 August 1898
|death_date=
|birth_place=Forbach, German Empire
|death_place=Châtillon-sur-Bar, France
|image=Bundesarchiv Bild 146-2006-0201, Günter Schwartzkopff.jpg
|image_size=
|caption=
|nickname=
|allegiance=   
|branch=Prussian ArmyLuftstreitkräfteReichsheer Luftwaffe
|serviceyears=1914–1940
|rank=Generalmajor (Posthumously)
|commands=StG 77
|unit=
|battles=
|awards=Knight's Cross of the Iron Cross
|laterwork=}}Günter Schwartzkopff''' (5 August 1898 – 14 May 1940) was an officer in the Luftwaffe during World War II. He was the namesake of the Bundeswehr General Schwartzkopff barracks in Hamburg which was renamed the in Generalleutnant-Graf-von-Baudissin-Kaserne June 1994.

Schwartzkopf was an important figure in the development of the dive-bomber arm in the pre-war Luftwaffe. He is credited with the title "Father of the Stuka.

He was awarded the Knight's Cross of the Iron Cross on 24 November 1939 and posthumously promoted to Generalmajor. He was killed on 14 May 1940 after his Junkers Ju 87 was shot down during the Battle of France.

Early life and career, World War I
Schwartzkopff was born on 5 August 1898 in Forbach (now Poznan) in the German Empire. In October 1914, he joined the military service in the Heer as a Fahnenjunker (officer cadet), serving with Infanterie-Regiment Nr. 41, an infantry regiment of the 1st Division. Schwartzkopff joined the Fliegertruppe in 1916 after being badly wounded in the Battle of Verdun in World War I.

Dive-bombing

World War II and legacy
On 14 May 1940, Schwartzkoff and his radio operator Feldwebel Heinz Follmer were killed in action in their Junkers Ju 87 B-2 (Werknummer 5328—factory number) while flying a ground attack mission south-west of Le Chesne. They were either shot down by anti-aircraft artillery, or by Hawker Hurricane fighters from No. 1 or No. 73 Squadron, near Châtillon-sur-Bar. Schwartzkopff was buried at the German war cemetery at Noyers-Pont-Maugis. Posthumously, he was awarded the Knight's Cross of the Iron Cross on 24 November 1940, and promoted to Generalmajor in June 1944, the promotion backdated to 1 May 1940.

The Air Force School of the Bundeswehr (Federal Armed Forces) in Hamburg was named General Schwartzkopff barracks in April 1965. The school was renamed in June 1994 to Lieutenant General Graf von Baudissin barracks. A lecture hall was named after him instead.

 Awards and decorations 

 Knight's Cross of the Iron Cross on 24 November 1940 as Oberst and Geschwaderkommodore of Sturzkampfgeschwader'' 77

References

Citations

Bibliography

 
 
 
 
 
 
 
 
 
 
 
 
 

1898 births
1940 deaths
People from the Province of Posen
Luftwaffe World War II generals
Luftstreitkräfte personnel
Luftwaffe pilots
Prussian Army personnel
Recipients of the Knight's Cross of the Iron Cross
Luftwaffe personnel killed in World War II
Reichswehr personnel
People from Poznań County
Recipients of the clasp to the Iron Cross, 1st class
Major generals of the Luftwaffe